Clubiona mimula is a species of sac spider in the family Clubionidae. It is found in the United States and Canada.

References

Clubionidae
Articles created by Qbugbot
Spiders described in 1928
Spiders of Canada
Spiders of the United States